The Mark is a 1961 film which tells the story of a convicted child molester, now out of prison, who is suspected in the molestation and beating of another child. The picture stars Stuart Whitman, Maria Schell, Rod Steiger and Brenda De Banzie.

Adapted by Sidney Buchman and Stanley Mann from the novel by Charles E. Israel, the film was directed by Guy Green.

The Mark was selected to compete for a Palme d'Or at the Cannes Film Festival and Whitman was nominated for the Oscar for Best Actor in a Leading Role.

Plot
Jim Fuller is released from prison after serving time for intent to commit child molestation. He attempts to return to society while dealing with his psychological demons with the help of psychiatrist Dr. McNally.

After being found employment, Jim begins a romantic relationship with Ruth Leighton, the company's secretary, and he appears to be on the way to a better life. However, when a child is reported as a possible abuse victim, Jim is picked up for questioning by the police. He has a genuine alibi, and he is cleared, but a tabloid reporter exposes Jim's previous conviction, and his presence in the company and community is no longer wanted.

Cast
 Stuart Whitman as Jim Fuller
 Rod Steiger as Dr. Edmund McNally
 Maria Schell as Ruth Leighton
 Brenda de Banzie as Gertrude Cartwright
 Donald Houston as Austin
 Donald Wolfit as Andrew Clive 
 Paul Rogers as Roy Milne
 Maurice Denham as Arnold Cartwright

Production
The Mark was filmed in black and white and Cinemascope.

Each of the three main characters was played by an actor not originally slated for the role. Stuart Whitman was a last-minute replacement for Richard Burton; Maria Schell took over for Jean Simmons, who was supposed to have played Ruth; and the role of the prison psychiatrist was intended for Trevor Howard before Rod Steiger was cast.

According to an interview given by Steiger many years later, he had visited an analyst himself in the 1950s and observed how he conducted himself. He played McNally as an Irishman to avoid stereotyping and added touches to impart more humanity to the character. Steiger claimed that the portrayal was so well-received by psychiatric professionals that he was invited to speak at a convention by a psychiatric society.

Reception
The Mark premiered in London on 26 January 1961 at 20th Century Fox's Carlton Theatre, Haymarket, London and opened in New York in October.

Its subject matter made it controversial, and it was criticised for making the paedophilic protagonist too sympathetic. It also received favourable reviews for its treatment of a difficult subject and praise for the acting, writing and directing.

References

External links
 The Mark (1961) at BFI
 

1961 films
Films shot in the Republic of Ireland
Films directed by Guy Green
CinemaScope films
1961 drama films
British drama films
Films scored by Richard Rodney Bennett
Films with screenplays by Sidney Buchman
Films with screenplays by Stanley Mann
Films about child sexual abuse
1960s English-language films
1960s British films